Solo Flytes is a compilation album by members of the American rock group Lynyrd Skynyrd. The album features tracks from various bands the members of Skynyrd had formed after the plane crash that took the lives of numerous members. The tracks were all recorded between 1978-1983 (Skynyrd reformed soon after).

Track listing

"Prime Time"  - The Rossington-Collins Band - 4:06
"Don't Misunderstand Me" - The Rossington-Collins Band - 3:58
"One In The Sun" - Steve Gaines - 4:59
"Getaway" - The Rossington-Collins Band - 7:27
"Opportunity" - The Rossington-Collins Band - 4:35
"Red Hot Light" - Artimus Pyle Band - 3:18
"Tashauna" - The Rossington-Collins Band - 4:58
"Seems Like Everyday" - The Rossington-Collins Band - 4:31
"Next Phone Call" - The Rossington-Collins Band - 3:35
"Pine Box" - The Rossington-Collins Band - 3:03
"Fancy Ideas" - The Rossington-Collins Band - 4:40
"Chapter One" - Allen Collins Band - 4:32
"Makes More Rock" - Artimus Pyle Band - 2:40
"I'm Free Today" - Rossington Collins Band - 3:24
"Welcome Me Home" - The Rossington Band - 4:44
"Sometimes You Can Put It Out" - Rossington Collins Band - 5:42
"Don't Misunderstand Me" - Rossington Collins Band - 5:41

References

External links
 

1999 greatest hits albums
Lynyrd Skynyrd compilation albums